O, Yeah! Ultimate Aerosmith Hits is a greatest hits album by American hard rock band Aerosmith, released in 2002 by Columbia Records and Geffen Records. A double-disc album, it includes 27 of the band's biggest hits in chronological order and spans the band's entire career up to 2002 (although it omits any material from the three albums they recorded between 1979-1985). Also included are a guest appearance on Run-DMC's cover of "Walk This Way" and two new songs, "Girls of Summer" and "Lay It Down", which the band recorded in Hawaii.

O, Yeah! has since been certified double platinum. Noticeable on the corners of album cover are the different variations of the Aerosmith logo used throughout the band's career.

O, Yeah! was re-released as The Essential Aerosmith on September 13, 2011. The album cover was changed, with a more straightforward profile picture of the band being used, and a limited edition bonus disc with six additional tracks was released, otherwise the track listing to the two CDs are the same.

Track listing

Personnel
Steven Tyler - lead vocals, keyboards, harmonica, percussion
Tom Hamilton - bass
Joey Kramer - drums, percussion
Joe Perry - guitar, background vocals
Brad Whitford - guitar

Production
Producers: Aerosmith, Glen Ballard, Adrian Barber, Ray Colcord, Jack Douglas, Bruce Fairbairn, Marti Frederiksen, Mark Hudson, Jason Mizell, Joe Perry, Rick Rubin, Matt Serletic, Russell Simmons, Steven Tyler
Mixing producer: Don DeVito
Mixing: Glen Ballard, Bob Clearmountain, Chris Fogel, Michael Fraser, Marti Frederiksen, Mark Hudson, Brendan O'Brien, Joe Perry, Mike Shipley, David Thoener, Steven Tyler
Remixing: Marti Frederiksen, Steven Tyler
Mastering: David Donnelly
Arranger: Matt Serletic
Music assistant: John Bionelli
Instrument technician: Jim Survis
Art direction: Sean Evans
Artist coordination: Leslie Langlo
Photography: Ross Halfin
Logo: Will Kennedy

Charts

Weekly charts

Year-end charts

Singles

Certifications

Release history

References

External links

2002 greatest hits albums
Aerosmith compilation albums
Albums produced by Bruce Fairbairn
Albums produced by Jack Douglas (record producer)
Albums produced by Marti Frederiksen
Albums produced by Rick Rubin
Albums produced by Glen Ballard
Albums produced by Matt Serletic
Albums produced by Mark Hudson (musician)
Columbia Records compilation albums
Geffen Records compilation albums